Claridon Township is one of the fifteen townships of Marion County, Ohio, United States.  The 2010 census found 2,742 people in the township, 577 of whom lived in the village of Caledonia.

Geography
Located in the eastern part of the county, it borders the following townships:
Scott Township - north
Tully Township - northeast corner
Canaan Township, Morrow County - east
Cardington Township, Morrow County - southeast corner
Richland Township - south
Pleasant Township - southwest corner
Marion Township - west
Grand Prairie Township - northwest corner

The village of Caledonia is located in northeastern Claridon Township.

Name and history
Statewide, the only other Claridon Township is located in Geauga County.  During the early formation of Marion County, the community of Claridon was considered as a possible location for the Marion County's county seat, however it lost out to the more centrally located village of Marion, Ohio.

Government
The township is governed by a three-member board of trustees, who are elected in November of odd-numbered years to a four-year term beginning on the following January 1. Two are elected in the year after the presidential election and one is elected in the year before it. There is also an elected township fiscal officer, who serves a four-year term beginning on April 1 of the year after the election, which is held in November of the year before the presidential election. Vacancies in the fiscal officership or on the board of trustees are filled by the remaining trustees.

References

External links
County website

Townships in Marion County, Ohio
Townships in Ohio